Cleveland Joseph "Pancake" Thomas Jr. (born December 2, 1993) is an American professional basketball player for REG of the Basketball Africa League (BAL).

High school career
Thomas attended Scotlandville Magnet High School. As a senior, he averaged 18 points, eight rebounds, three steals and two assists per game, earning Class 5A All-State honors. Thomas posted 21 points and 11 rebounds in a 82-48 victory over McKinley High School in the state title game.

College career
Thomas began his college basketball career with New Mexico, helping the Lobos reach the NCAA Tournament as a freshman. He averaged 3.9 points per game as a sophomore and saw his minutes dwindle as the season progressed. Thomas opted to transfer following the season, but tore his ACL three days later. He opted to come to Hartford, one of the few schools to show interest despite the injury. As a junior, he averaged 19 points and 6.4 rebounds per game and had four 30-point performances. Thomas transferred to Western Kentucky for his redshirt senior season.

Professional career
Thomas played for KTE-Duna Aszfalt during the 2020-21 season and averaged 14.8 points, 5.8 rebounds, 3.1 assists, and 1.3 steals per game. On September 6, 2021, Thomas signed with Apollon Patras of the Greek Basket League. He averaged 8.8 points, 3.6 rebounds, and 2.0 assists per game. On February 4, 2022, Thomas parted ways with the team.

In March 2022, Thomas was added to the roster of Rwandan club REG for the 2022 BAL season, the second season of the Basketball Africa League. On March 6, he scored a game-high 26 points in his league debut to help REG win the first game over AS Salé. He also went on to win the Rwanda Basketball League championship in 2022.

In October 2022, Thomas played for Al-Ahli Benghazi in the 2022 Arab Club Basketball Championship. He later joined Beirut Club of the Lebanese Basketball League (LBL) and West Asia Super League (WASL).

On February 15, 2023, Thomas rejoined REG.

Personal life
Thomas gained the nickname "Pancake" from his grandmother, who remarked that his mother's stomach was flat as a pancake during her pregnancy with him. He is a pescatarian and is an advocate for depression awareness

BAL career statistics

|-
|-
|style="text-align:left;"|2022
|style="text-align:left;"|REG
| 6 || 6 || 35.2 || .419 || .375 || .813 || 5.3 || 4.8 || 1.5 || 0.3 || 20.3

Awards and accomplishments

Club
REG
Rwanda Basketball League: (2022)
Zlatorog Laško
 Alpe Adria Cup: (2018)

Individual
 RBL All-Star: (2022)
 Second-team All-America East: (2016)

References

External links
RealGM profile 
New Mexico Lobos bio
Western Kentucky Hilltoppers bio

1993 births
Living people
American men's basketball players
American expatriate basketball people in Hungary
American expatriate basketball people in Slovenia
Apollon Patras B.C. players
Western Kentucky Hilltoppers basketball players
Hartford Hawks men's basketball players
New Mexico Lobos men's basketball players
REG BBC players
Basketball players from Louisiana